KOBB-FM (93.7 MHz) is a radio station licensed to serve Bozeman, Montana, United States. The station's licensee is held by Desert Mountain Broadcasting Licenses, LLC.

The offices and all the studios are located southwest of Bozeman at "Radio Ranch", 5445 Johnson Road. KOBB-FM shares a transmitter site with KBOZ (AM) and KBOZ-FM, east of the studios on Johnson Road and Fowler Lane. KBOZ-FM, KOZB, and KOBB-FM all have CPs to move to a new shared transmitter site on top of Green Mountain, along I-90 east of Bozeman.

In 1984, it aired a Top-40 music format, competing against KCDQ. A few decades later when it became KOBB-FM, it began airing an oldies music format. The station derives most of its programming from Scott Shannon's The True Oldies Channel. , KOBB-FM was the only station in Montana to carry The True Oldies Channel.

The station was assigned the KOBB-FM call letters by the Federal Communications Commission on April 11, 1997.  Before oldies the station carried a country music format as "The Kat".

On June 3, 2018, KOBB-FM and its sister stations went off the air.

Effective December 6, 2019, the licenses for KOBB-FM and its sister stations were involuntary assigned from Reier Broadcasting Company to Richard J. Samson, as Receiver. The licenses for these stations were sold to Desert Mountain Broadcasting Licenses, LLC in a deal completed in January 2022. 

As of 2021, KOBB-FM is back on the air with a Hot AC format branded as "93.7 The Cob."

Translators
KOBB-FM programming is also carried on a broadcast translator station to extend or improve the coverage area of the primary station.

Previous logo

References

External links

OBB-FM
Gallatin County, Montana
Radio stations established in 1980
1980 establishments in Montana
Classic hits radio stations in the United States